The Golden Horse Award for Best Original Film Song is an award presented annually at the Golden Horse Awards by the Taipei Golden Horse Film Festival Executive Committee. The latest ceremony was held in 2022, with the award going to the song "What's on Your Mind" from the film My Best Friend's Breakfast.

References

Golden Horse Film Awards